Cannon & Fetzer was an American architectural firm that operated between 1909 and 1937 in Salt Lake City, Utah. Lewis T. Cannon and John Fetzer were the principal architects. A number of its works are listed on the U.S. National Register of Historic Places. For a brief time between 1910 and 1915, the firm was named Cannon, Fetzer & Hansen after partnering with Ramm Hansen. Many of their works survive and are listed on the U.S. National Register of Historic Places.

Images of architectural works

Other works include (with attribution)
Fifth Ward Meetinghouse (built 1910), 740 S. 300 West Salt Lake City, Utah (Cannon & Fetzer), NRHP-listed
Idaho Republican Building (build 1916), 167 W. Bridge St., Blackfoot, Idaho (Cannon & Fetzer), NRHP-listed
Technical High School, 241 N. 300 West Salt Lake City, Utah (Cannon & Fetzer, et al.), formerly NRHP-listed
US Post Office-Cedar City Main, 10 N. Main Cedar City, Utah (Cannon & Fetzer), NRHP-listed
Wasatch Springs Plunge, 840 N. 300 West Salt Lake City, Utah (Cannon & Fetzer), NRHP-listed

References

Architecture firms based in Utah
Architects of Latter Day Saint religious buildings and structures
1909 establishments in Utah